The Half Acre Recreation and Wellness Center (formerly Half Acre Gym) is currently the recreation center for the University of Wyoming.

It was originally a 4,000-seat multi-purpose arena in Laramie, in the U.S. state of Wyoming. It opened in 1928.

History
It was home to the University of Wyoming Cowboys basketball team from 1928 until 1951 when it was replaced by the War Memorial Fieldhouse.  The size of the arena was about a half acre, hence its name.  When it opened, it was one of the nation's largest indoor arenas.

The venue is currently a recreation center on the campus of the University of Wyoming. In 2012, the university   announced a $27 million renovation to begin in the Spring of 2013, and be completed by the Fall of 2014. The project was completed in two phases. Phase One would consist of the demolition and recreation of the east portion of the building, and Phase Two would include the reopening of the east portion, and the closure and construction of the west portion which is the historical section of the building. Throughout the renovation, the university hoped to keep and incorporate as much of the historical structure and facade as possible.

The improvements, according to the University of Wyoming's web site, included elevators, added classrooms, a space for athletic training, new racquetball courts, a climbing wall for bouldering, a dance studio, athletics track, and new locker rooms with access to the pool.

Amenities

Aquatics
 Pool area

Corbett gym and pool
 Corbett gym – basketball/volleyball courts and badminton courts
 Corbett pool – 25 yard by 25 meter L-shaped pool with a diving well

Historic gym
 basketball/volleyball courts
 badminton courts

MAC gym
 basketball/volleyball courts 
 badminton courts
 Indoor soccer/Futsal
 racquetball courts with convertible squash court

Miscellaneous
1/8 mile, four-lane track

References

External links
Arena information
Venue history

Basketball venues in Wyoming
Buildings and structures in Laramie, Wyoming
Defunct college basketball venues in the United States
Indoor soccer venues in the United States
Indoor track and field venues in Wyoming
Soccer venues in Wyoming
Sports venues completed in 1928
Swimming venues in Wyoming
University and college student recreation centers in the United States
Volleyball venues in Wyoming
Wyoming Cowboys and Cowgirls basketball venues
1928 establishments in Wyoming